ES Gokin (ES合金) is a joint collaboration toy line produced/manufactured by Hong Kong Action Toys and licensing/distributed by Japanese toy company Art Storm. The line consists of SD (Super Deformed) Die-Cast robots which mainly focuses on mechas. It was first introduced and released in the year 2009. Though the line is in the SD family, Action Toys/Art Storm has made each robot (released so far) differ in size to make it look realistic. One of the selling points of the figures/robots is the articulation design. Despite it having limited mobility, they are still considered rather flexible enough to evoke some of the memorable moves and attacks seen in each of the robots' respective series. Each of these figure/robots come with a stand and some of them even have neat featuring gimmicks implemented in them. Though the ES Gokin are SD's, it is targeted to a mature demographic.

Line-Up

Other Releases

Special Releases

External links
Official ES Gokin website (Japanese)

Japanese die-cast toys
2010s toys
Toy mecha
Toy companies established in 2009
Chinese companies established in 2009
2009 establishments in Hong Kong